"Go-Go" was the fourth single released by Alphabeat. It was introduced on the international edition of their first album, but was not released as a single outside of Denmark.

It features backing vocals by girl band The Real Heat.

Charts 
"Go-Go" charted in Denmark at number 14.

References 

2008 singles
Alphabeat songs
2008 songs